Has-Beens and Never-Weres is the tenth 12" vinyl record album by DIY home recording pioneer and one-man band R. Stevie Moore.

Track listing

Side one
 "Intelligence" (3:45) 
 "Near Tonight" (4:15) 
 "Love Is the Way to My Heart" (2:42) 
 "Skin Mags" (6:48) 
 "Bonus Track" (LP Only) (1:15) 
 "You Came Along Just in Time" (3:00) 
 "I'm Out of My Mind" (7:20)

Side two
 "Sit Down" (4:35) 
 "Banana Jerseyjam" (1:08) 
 "I Will Want to Die" (4:50) 
 "Martyrdom" (4:10) 
 "Pow Wow" (3:43) 
 "The Residents" (2:20) 
 "What's the Point?" (2:42) 
 "If You See Kay" (2:40) 
 "14 Months Back" (1:50)

External links
 RSM's Has-Beens and Never-Weres webpage

1990 albums
R. Stevie Moore albums
New Weird America albums